Chura may refer to :

 Chura (knife), a version of the Pesh-kabz knife
 Choora or chura, bangles worn by an Indian bride on her wedding day
 Ch'ura, a mountain in the Andes of Peru

See also 
 
 Chuda State, a former princely state in present Gujarat, western India
 Chuhra, a caste in India and a tribe in Pakistan
 Shura (disambiguation)